Jean Germain may refer to:

Jean Germain I (1703–1777), also known as Joannes Goermans, French harpsichord maker, see Goermans
Jean Germain II (1735–c. 1795), his son, French harpsichord maker, see Goermans
Jean Germain (politician) (1947–2015), French politician